Tapeheads is a 1988 comedy film directed by Bill Fishman and starring John Cusack, Tim Robbins, Sam Moore and Junior Walker. The film was produced by Michael Nesmith, who briefly appears as a bottled water delivery man.

Plot
After losing their jobs as security guards, best friends Ivan (John Cusack) and Josh (Tim Robbins) start a music video production company called "Video Aces". When they meet their childhood heroes, 1970s soul duo Swanky Modes (Sam Moore and Junior Walker), Ivan and Josh concoct a scheme to give them a new audience by hijacking a Menudo concert, getting them to perform in Menudo's place, and broadcasting it live across the country on a television satellite hook-up.

The movie also features a fake ad spot for a real Los Angeles restaurant, Roscoe's House of Chicken 'n Waffles. Notable  appearances in the film include: Mary Crosby, of the soap opera Dallas; character actors Clu Gulager and Doug McClure; football player Lyle Alzado; 1960s actress  Connie Stevens; Soul Train host Don Cornelius; singer Courtney Love; Navasota singer King Cotton; original "Human Beat-Box" Doug E. Fresh; ska-punk band Fishbone (who also perform the incidental score) as "Ranchbone"; The Dead Boys and The Lords of the New Church singer Stiv Bators; Ted Nugent; "Weird Al" Yankovic; and Dead Kennedys singer Jello Biafra, in a cameo as an FBI agent.

Cast
 John Cusack as Ivan Alexeev
 Tim Robbins as Josh Tager
 Mary Crosby as Samantha Gregory
 Clu Gulager as Senator Norman Mart
 Doug McClure as Sid Tager
 Katy Boyer as Belinda Mart
 Jessica Walter as Kay Mart
 Sam Moore as Billy Diamond
 Junior Walker as Lester Diamond
 Susan Tyrrell as Nikki Morton
 Lee Arenberg as Norton
 Xander Berkeley as Ricky Fell
 "Weird Al" Yankovic as himself
 Don Cornelius as Mo Fuzz
 King Cotton as Roscoe
 Zander Schloss as Heavy Metal Fan
 Martha C. Quinn as RVTV-VJ
 Ted Nugent as Rock Star
 Jello Biafra as FBI Man #1
 Bob McLean as FBI Man #2
 Connie Stevens as June Tager
 Courtney Love (uncredited) as Norman's Spanker
 Stiv Bators as Dick Slammer
 Bob Goldthwait (credited as Jack Cheese) as Don Druzel
 David Anthony Higgins as Visual Aplomb
 Michael Nesmith as Water Man
 Jennifer Balgobin as Calypso Dancer
 Sy Richardson as The Bartender
 Brie Howard as Flygirl
 Billy Davis as Swanky Modes Band Member, Guitar
 Lyle Alzado as Conan the Tour Guide

Soundtrack
The music supervisor for the film was Nigel Harrison.  The soundtrack album was released on Island Records.

The film's soundtrack (but not the soundtrack album) includes the song "Repave America" written and performed by Tim Robbins, credited as Bob Roberts four years before that movie was released. "Repave America" also appeared in the Bob Roberts soundtrack with the lyrics slightly altered to become "Retake America".

Reception

References

External links
 
 
 
 

1988 films
1988 comedy films
American comedy films
American independent films
1980s English-language films
Films set in Los Angeles
Films shot in Los Angeles
NBC Productions films
Films directed by Bill Fishman
1980s American films
1988 directorial debut films